The Rhenish helm is a type of spire typical of Romanesque church architecture of the historic Rhineland.

It is a pyramidal roof on towers of square plan. Each of the four sides of the roof is rhomboid in form, with the long diagonal running from the apex of roof to one of the corners of the supporting tower. Each side of the tower is topped with an even triangular gable from the peak of which runs a ridge to the apex of the roof. Thus, the corners of the pyramidical roof do not correspond with the corners of the tower but with the peaks of the gables.

An early if not the first example of such spires can be found on the four tall towers of the Cathedral of Speyer. Rhenish helm spires are mainly found in the historical Rhineland but there are a few churches in other areas with such spires.

Examples of churches in the historical Rhineland
 Speyer Cathedral
 Maria Laach Abbey, near Andernach
 Basilica of St. Castor, Koblenz
 Collegiate Church of St. Bartholomew, Liège
 Limburg Cathedral
 St. Dionysius, Rhens
 Munsterkerk, Roermond
 St. Faith's Church, Sélestat
 Basilica of the Holy Apostles, Cologne
 St. Maria Lyskirchen, Cologne
 St. Aegidius Church, Bad Honnef
 Eibingen Abbey

Examples of churches outside of the historical Rhineland

Germany
 St. Mary's Church, Lübeck
 Stumm-Kirche, Brebach-Fechingen, Saarbrücken

The Netherlands
 Basilica of Our Lady, Maastricht

Canada
 Moravian Church, Nain, Newfoundland and Labrador
 Saint Peter's and Saint John's Anglican Church, Baddeck, Nova Scotia
 Trinity Anglican Church, Jordan Falls, Nova Scotia

China
 St. Michael's Cathedral, Qingdao

England
 Church of St Mary the Blessed Virgin, Sompting, West Sussex
 St Margaret's Church, Wormhill, Derbyshire
 St Mary's Church, Flixton, Suffolk
 St Peter and St Paul, Hawkley, Hampshire
 St Stephen's Church, West Bowling, Bradford, West Yorkshire
 St Andrew's Church, Churcham, Gloucestershire
 St Anne's Church, Bowden Hill, Wiltshire

Hungary
 Abbey Church of St James, Lébény
 Mary Magdalene Church, Egregy, Hévíz

Denmark
 Ribe Cathedral

The United States
 Old Chapel (Amherst, Massachusetts)

Further examples
Preußisches Regierungsgebäude, Koblenz
 Temple Neuf, Metz
 https://www.geograph.org.uk/photo/3852199
 https://www.sussexexpress.co.uk/news/mysterious-and-magnificent-lewes-home-market-1109789?amp
Towers
Architectural elements
Church architecture